Tachina virginea is a species of fly in the genus Tachina of the family Tachinidae that is endemic to Europe.

References

Insects described in 1838
Diptera of Europe
virginea